The 2003–04 SK Rapid Wien season is the 106th season in club history.

Squad statistics

Goal scorers

Fixtures and results

Bundesliga

League table

Cup

References

2003-04 Rapid Wien Season
Austrian football clubs 2003–04 season